Pervukhin, female form Pervukhina is a Russian surname.

Notable people with this surname include:
 Ilya Pervukhin (born 1991), Russian canoeist
 Konstantin Pervukhin (1863-1915), Russian painter
 Mikhail Pervukhin (1904-1978), Soviet official
 Vasili Pervukhin (born 1956), Russian ice hockey player

Russian-language surnames